A bobèche is a cup or ring at the top of a candlestick, used to catch melted wax running down the side of the candle. Usually made of glass, but often seen made of paper as well.

Candles